Love to Share is an Australian Saturday cooking series which aired Network Ten from Saturday 15 September 2012 at 4pm.

The show is based around people, including chefs, and celebrity guests, sharing their recipes with others. The show also has a website collection of recipes that users can share and read recipes.

Network 10 original programming
Australian cooking television series
2012 Australian television series debuts
2013 Australian television series endings